The 2017 World Fencing Championships was held at the Arena Leipzig in Leipzig, Germany from 19 to 26 July 2017.

During the championships there was a demonstration of wheelchair fencing. Russian Ksenia Ovsyannikova was Head of the Promotion Commission of IWAS and Pal Szekeres IWAS Wheelchair Fencing Chairman and Udo Ziegler IWAS Secretary General was also present at the Arena Leipzig Stadium.

Schedule

Medal summary

Medal table
 Host nation

Men's events

Women's events

References

External links
Official website 

 
World Fencing Championships
World Fencing Championships
2010s in Saxony
International fencing competitions hosted by Germany
July 2017 events in Germany
July 2017 sports events in Europe
Sports competitions in Leipzig
2017